The 22nd Biathlon European Championships were held in Otepää, Estonia from January 28 to February 3, 2015.

There were total of 15 competitions held: sprint, pursuit and individual both for Open and Junior, relay races for Open and a mixed relay for junior.

Schedule of events 
The schedule of the event stands below. All times in CET.

Results

Men's

 Russian team (Alexey Volkov, Anton Babikov, Aleksandr Pechenkin, Alexey Slepov) which finished first (1:10:50.9), later was disqualified because of an anti-doping rule violation by Aleksandr Pechenkin. The medals were reallocated accordingly.

Women's

Junior

Men's

Women's

Mixed

References

External links 
 Official webpage

Biathlon European Championships
International sports competitions hosted by Estonia
2015 in biathlon
2015 in Estonian sport
Otepää Parish